North Dock may refer to 
North Dock, Garston
North Dock, Swansea